Gavrio, Andros is the first port to the Cyclades.

Gallery

References

Populated places in Andros